This a list of ecoregions in Iraq.

Terrestrial ecoregions
Iraq is in the Palearctic realm. Ecoregions are listed by biome.

Temperate broadleaf and mixed forests
 Zagros Mountains forest steppe

Temperate grasslands, savannas, and shrublands
 Middle East steppe

Flooded grasslands and savannas
 Tigris-Euphrates alluvial salt marsh

Mediterranean forests, woodlands, and shrub
 Eastern Mediterranean conifer–sclerophyllous–broadleaf forests

Deserts and xeric shrublands
 Arabian Desert
 Mesopotamian shrub desert
 Persian Gulf desert and semi-desert
 South Iran Nubo-Sindian desert and semi-desert

Freshwater ecoregions
 Arabian Interior
 Lower Tigris and Euphrates
 Upper Tigris and Euphrates

Marine ecoregions
 Persian Gulf

References

 
Iraq
Ecoregions